Joao Victor Amaral dos Santos Silva (born 8 May 1993) is a Brazilian footballer who plays as an attacking midfielder for U. de G.

References

External links
 
 

1993 births
Living people
Footballers from São Paulo
Brazilian footballers
Paulínia Futebol Clube players
Capivariano Futebol Clube players
Guarani FC players
Clube Atlético Votuporanguense players
Clube Atlético Penapolense players
Leones Negros UdeG footballers
Association football midfielders